Halgerda theobroma is a species of sea slug, a dorid nudibranch, shell-less marine gastropod mollusks in the family Discodorididae.

Distribution
This species was described from Rottnest Island, Western Australia.

References

Discodorididae
Gastropods described in 2001